Hrabove is a village in northwestern Ukraine, in Stara Vyzhivka Hromada in Kovel Raion of Volyn Oblast, but was formerly administered within Stara Vyzhivka Raion. Its Zip Code is 44442.

References 

Villages in Kovel Raion